Demi Lee Courtney Stokes (born 12 December 1991) is an English professional footballer who plays for Manchester City and the England national team. She previously played for Sunderland in the English FA Women's Premier League.

Club career
Stokes joined Sunderland's youth academy as an 8-year-old and began playing in the first team at 16. She was part of the team which won the 2008–09 FA Women's Premier League Northern Division and lost the 2009 FA Women's Cup final 2–1 to Arsenal. She accepted a four-year scholarship to the University of South Florida in 2011.

In 2012 Stokes played 13 games for Vancouver Whitecaps in the pro-am North American W-League.

In January 2015, Stokes signed a three-year professional contract with Manchester City.

International career

England
In July 2009 Stokes featured as England under-19 won the 2009 UEFA Women's Under-19 Championship in Belarus, with a 2–0 final win over Sweden. In 2010, she helped England reach the final of the 2010 UEFA Women's Under-19 Championship in Macedonia, where they lost their title to France. Later that summer Stokes started two of England's three games at the 2010 FIFA U-20 Women's World Cup in Germany.

Newly appointed England coach Mark Sampson included Stokes in a 30-player squad for the annual training camp in La Manga, which included a match against Norway on 17 January 2014. She started the 1–1 draw with Norway at left back, to win her first senior cap. In April 2014 she scored in England's 9–0 thrashing of Montenegro at Falmer Stadium, Brighton and Hove.

Stokes was disappointed to be left out of England's squad for the 2015 FIFA Women's World Cup. She was restored to the squad for the subsequent UEFA Women's Euro 2017 qualifying campaign. In the group stage of the 2019 FIFA Women's World Cup, Stokes played left back in England's match against Japan where she helped England win 2–0. Stokes also played in the quarter final against Norway, helping England beat Norway 3–0.

In June 2022 Stokes was included in the England squad which won the UEFA Women's Euro 2022.

Great Britain
In July 2013 Stokes captained Great Britain to a gold medal in the 2013 Summer Universiade in Kazan, Russia. On 27 May 2021 it was announced that Stokes had been selected in the Great Britain women's Olympic football team for the 2020 Olympics.

Personal life
Stokes is of Jamaican descent through her father. She went to Gateshead College so she could continue to study whilst still playing football.

Stokes is in a same-sex relationship with Katie Harrington. The couple are engaged and had a baby in 2022.

Career statistics

Club

International

International goals 
Scores and results list England's goal tally first.

Honours
Sunderland

 FA Cup runner-up: 2008-09

Manchester City
 FA WSL Cup: 2016, 2018–19, 2021–22
 FA WSL: 2016
 FA Cup: 2016–17, 2018–19, 2019–20

England

UEFA Women's Championship: 2022
SheBelieves Cup: 2019
Arnold Clark Cup: 2022

Individual
 PFA WSL Team of the Year: 2018, 2019
Freedom of the City of London (announced 1 August 2022)

See also
 List of England women's international footballers
 List of Manchester City W.F.C. players
 List of Vancouver Whitecaps Women players
 FA WSL records and statistics

References

Further reading
 Aluko, Eniola (2019), They Don't Teach This, Random House, 
 Caudwell, Jayne (2013), Women's Football in the UK: Continuing with Gender Analyses, Taylor & Francis, 
 Dunn, Carrie (2019), Pride of the Lionesses: The Changing Face of Women's Football in England, Pitch Publishing (Brighton) Limited, 
 Dunn, Carrie (2016), The Roar of the Lionesses: Women's Football in England, Pitch Publishing Limited, 
 Grainey, Timothy (2012), Beyond Bend It Like Beckham: The Global Phenomenon of Women's Soccer, University of Nebraska Press,

External links

Demi Stokes profile at Manchester City FC
Demi Stokes profile at the Football Association

Living people
1991 births
Black British sportswomen
England women's international footballers
English women's footballers
England women's under-23 international footballers
Olympic footballers of Great Britain
English sportspeople of Jamaican descent
Expatriate women's soccer players in the United States
English expatriate sportspeople in Canada
English expatriate sportspeople in the United States
English expatriate women's footballers
Expatriate women's soccer players in Canada
FA Women's National League players
Women's Super League players
Lesbian sportswomen
LGBT association football players
LGBT Black British people
English LGBT sportspeople
Manchester City W.F.C. players
Medalists at the 2013 Summer Universiade
2019 FIFA Women's World Cup players
Footballers at the 2020 Summer Olympics
South Florida Bulls women's soccer players
Footballers from South Shields
Sunderland A.F.C. Ladies players
Universiade gold medalists for Great Britain
Universiade medalists in football
USL W-League (1995–2015) players
Vancouver Whitecaps FC (women) players
Women's association football defenders
University of South Florida olympians
21st-century English LGBT people
UEFA Women's Euro 2022 players
UEFA Women's Championship-winning players
UEFA Women's Euro 2017 players